The Bibliothèque nationale du Burkina Faso (in English: National Library of Burkina Faso) is the legal deposit and copyright library for Burkina Faso. It was established on November 6, 1996.

National legislation determines the process of collection and preservation of national documentary heritage, primarily through legal deposit. Laws and regulations also govern the publication of the national bibliography, bibliographic control and the management of ISBNs and ISSNs.  According to the United Nations, as of 2014 approximately 34 percent of adult Burkinabés can read.

See also
 National Archives of Burkina Faso

References

Bibliography
  
 . (Includes information about the national library)

External links
 Bibliothèque nationale du Burkina Faso 

Burkinabé culture
Burkina Faso
1996 establishments in Burkina Faso
Libraries established in 1996
Buildings and structures in Ouagadougou
Libraries in Burkina Faso